Papa is a surname which may refer to:

Alfonso Papa (born 1970), Italian politician, former judge and professor
Bob Papa (born 1964), American sportscaster
Cyril Papa (born 1984), French ice hockey player
Emiliano Papa (born 1982), Argentina footballer
Gary Papa (1954 – 2009), American sportscaster and brother of Greg
Greg Papa (born 1962), American sportscaster and brother of Gary
Rav Papa (c. 300-375), a Babylonian Amora from the Talmud
Salvatore Papa (born 1990), Italian footballer
Tom Papa (born 1968), American comedian and actor